Ravinder Singh Ravi is an Indian politician and member of the Bharatiya Janata Party. Ravi was a member of the Himachal Pradesh Legislative Assembly from the Thural constituency in Kangra district.

References 

People from Kangra district
Bharatiya Janata Party politicians from Himachal Pradesh
Living people
21st-century Indian politicians
Year of birth missing (living people)
Himachal Pradesh MLAs 1993–1998
Himachal Pradesh MLAs 1998–2003
Himachal Pradesh MLAs 2003–2007
Himachal Pradesh MLAs 2007–2012